Altınhisar Dam, a.k.a. Altunhisar Dam, is a dam in Niğde Province, Turkey, built between 1985 and 1988.

See also
List of dams and reservoirs in Turkey

External links
Altınhisar Dam at DSI website

Dams in Niğde Province
Dams completed in 1988